Jean Jacod (born  1944) is a French mathematician specializing in stochastic processes and probability theory. He has been a professor at the Université Pierre et Marie Curie.
He has made fundamental contributions to a wide range of topics in probability theory including stochastic calculus, limit theorems, martingale problems, Malliavin calculus
and statistics of stochastic processes.

Biography

Jean Jacod graduated from Ecole Polytechnique  in 1965 and obtained his Doctorat d'État in Mathematics from the Université Paris-VI. His advisor was Jacques Neveu.

Selected bibliography

J. JACOD, P. PROTTER: Asymptotic error distributions for the Euler method for stochastic differential equations. Ann. Probab., 26, 267-307 (1998).
J. JACOD: Non-parametric kernel estimation of the diffusion for a diffusion process. Scand. J. Statist. 27, 83-96 (2000).
 E. EBERLEIN, J. JACOD, S. RAIBLE: Levy term structure models: no–arbitrage and completeness. Finance and Stochastics, 9, 67–88 (2005)
J. JACOD: Asymptotic properties of power variations of L'evy processes. ESAIM-PS, 11, 173-196 (2007).
J. JACOD: Asymptotic properties of realized power variations and associated functionals 129-A of semimartingales. Stoch. Proc. Appl., 118, 517-559 (2008).
Y. AIT–SAHALIA, J. JACOD: Testing for jumps in a discretely observed process. Annals of Statistics, 37, 1, 184-222 (2009).
J. JACOD, Y. LI, P. MYKLAND, M. PODOLSKIJ, M. VETTER: Microstructure noise in the continuous case: the pre-averaging approach. Stoch. Proc. Appl., 119, 7, 2249-2276
(2009).
 J. JACOD, Z. KOWALSKI, A. NIKEGHBALI: Mod-Gaussian convergence: new limit theorems in probability and number theory. Forum Math. 23, 835-873 (2011).
 A. DIOP, J. JACOD, V. TODOROV: Central Limit Theorem for Approximate Quadratic Variations of Pure Jump Ito Semimartingales. Stoch. Proc. Appl. 123, 839-886 (2013).

See also
List of École Polytechnique alumni

References

External links

Jean Jacod's Home page

1948 births
Living people
20th-century French mathematicians
21st-century French mathematicians
Pierre and Marie Curie University alumni
École Polytechnique alumni
Probability theorists